RT-RK is a Serbian R&D company and national research institute that delivers development services and own products in the arena of real time embedded systems, with focus on consumer electronics and automotive industry. Headquartered in Novi Sad, with offices in Belgrade, Banja Luka (Bosnia and Herzegovina) and Osijek (Croatia) with over 550 engineers, RT-RK is one of the biggest development houses in Southeast Europe.

RT-RK is engaged in embedded system design, TV software development, automotive software development, Digital Signal Processing (DSP), UI/UX design, product development including small scale production, testing of Set-Top Box (STB) and multimedia devices, and FPGA rapid prototyping.


History
In 1991, a small group of professors and assistants working at University of Novi Sad Faculty of Technical Sciences, Chair for Computer Engineering, launched first projects for telephony and digital signaling protocols (SSNo7, ISDN on DSS1 D channel). Their interest for business further evolved to automation processes in Serbian oil industry, where they were involved in projects for gas pipeline management. Recognizing the benefits of the University environment, they started a company named FTN-IRAM-RT. Close cooperation of FTN-IRAM-RT with The University of Novi Sad attracted Micronas, German company, to launch MicronasNIT within the same environment and with the same management. Having become a Micronas’ subsidiary MicronasNIT entered the era of expansion in DSP, FPGA and Digital TV technology. 
In 2005, Serbia Investment and Export Promotion Agency (SIEPA) awarded MicronasNIT as the biggest exporter of the year in SME (Small and Medium Enterprises) category.

New technologies, customer service, and world-wide market access brought new customers, emerging the need for a new business model to render the services. The new circumstances gave rise to foundation of a new company, RT-RK.
In April 2009, RT-RK bought MicronasNIT, becoming the largest Serbian company for embedded system design.

The Ministry of Science and Technological Development of the Republic of Serbia accredited RT-RK Computer Based Systems LLC as a National Research and Development Institute. In their explanation, Advisory Committee stated that the scientific programs of RT-RK contribute to development of new products and devices, introduce new and improve existing technological processes, systems and services, and perform transfer of knowledge and technology. The company employs scientific researchers, has programs for young developers, and has facilities, equipment, and other resources to implement its programs.

Operations

Automotive
RT-RK is engaged on real time applications involving the major SoCs of the industry such as those of Texas Instruments, Qualcomm, Renesas, NVIDIA and Infineon.

It carries out system software development, AUTOSAR porting and customization, projects complying with ASPICE processes and functional safety, UI/UX development, reference hardware design, and technology transfer to Tier1/OEM. RT-RK is specialized in relevant operating systems and industry standards, such as Linux, ISO26262, Ethernet, FlexRay, MOST, HTML5, GENIVI.

These are the services the company is offering:
 Software and operating systems for ECU, based on AUTOSAR and Functional safety standard ISO26262
 Software solutions for driver assistance 
 HMI development for Head Units, Instrument Cluster and Head-up Displays
 Development of In-Vehicle Infotainment systems (IVI) – including reception of TV signal and services
 Integration, customization, and development services (platform selection, OS, complex device drivers, communication, ECU abstraction, services, microcontroller abstraction, AUTOSAR RTE, and application software components)

Product portfolio and solutions:
 Automotive machine vision Middleware enables cross platform execution of ADAS algorithms utilizing various inputs, outputs and multiple processing cores. 
 Automotive machine vision ALPHA reference board based on System On Chip of Texas Instruments. The board is intended for car manufacturers (OEMs), automotive design houses (Tier1/2/3) for rapid prototyping, TI automotive customers, and algorithm developers for demo purposes.

Digital TV software
The company’s journey in Digital TV began in 2001 with joint venture with Micronas, Germany to develop software for their TVs. With time it transformed from an extended workbench approach towards a system supplier becoming a full Micronas subsidiary to deliver software solutions for Digital TV, and take over significant support responsibility towards Micronas' customers. When Micronas closed down their consumer business unit, it left RT-RK fully independent and continuing with TV software development.

RT-RK was the first company to announce successful porting of the big-endian version of the Android™ operating system for the MIPS® architecture  facilitating SoC manufacturers to use Android, targeting market of Digital TVs (DTV),  Set-Top Boxes (STB) and for applications in the digital home.

Zoran Corporation singled out RT-RK for porting Android onto their System on Chip (SOC), joining forces in development of multimedia applications and services for connected TV.

In 2011 RT-RK became a shareholder of iWedia, a Swiss-based company and operates as system integrator on Set-Top Box and TV software products based on their DVB middleware.

In 2012 RT-RK announced cooperation with General Satellite on their Set-Top Box GS-8305 deployed on the network of Tricolor TV, which was developed by RT-RK. Mass production of the box in their factory in Kaliningrad has been tested by the RT-RK’s BBT Set-Top Box testing products.

Its Android background was helpful to integrate IPTV and broadcast TV (DVB/ATSC) functionalities inside TV and STB devices powered by the Android operating system called ANDROID4TV, made Google conclude an agreement with the company to provide integration services to Google partners wishing to deploy Google TV in their products.

Android Set-Top Box deployments continue with Swisscom IPTV STB, and Bouygues Telecom Bbox Miami hybrid box with Google Mobile Services (Google Play Store, Google Music, Chrome, YouTube, Google Play Movies) certified by Google.

In September 2014 the company made ANDROID4TV software framework open source facilitating TV operators worldwide with the benefits of leveraging of Android openness, flexibility, and developers' community.

iWedia has many projects, including SAT>IP server and Linux-based H.264 Set-Top Box based on STMicroelectronics’ Liege chipset, both boxes being produced by RT-RK.

RT-RK continues operations providing services to other players in the Digital TV world, some of them being: SmarDTV, Vidmind, and Wyplay.

Home automation

OBLO is an end-to-end home automation solution by RT-RK which enables home automation, including: 
Centralized automation via the control hub and the cloud
Automation apps (mobile, web), to control home from any place, any time
Connectivity among home devices like Zigbee, Z-Wave and WiFi.
Set of ready-made devices to automate lighting and energy consumption
Blueprints for adding “smarts” to devices

OBLO is scalable and allows the selection and customization of components to make an automated home.

BBT (Black Box Testing)

The line of RT-RK products codenamed BBT provides testing equipment and services to Set-Top Box and multimedia devices development and production.

RT-RK supports the Digital TV product life cycle, from marketing through to development, production and qualification, superseding human testing labor of 600 man/days monthly, for the largest European and the third largest OEM in the world Vestel. 

As announced by the HbbTV Association, an initiative for providing an open standard for the delivery of broadcast and broadband services through connected TVs and set-top boxes, RT-RK is a supplier of majority test cases included in the HbbTV 2.0 test suite, in addition to all the applicable ones from the HbbTV 1/1.5 test suite and other sources. In addition, RT-RK supplies additional tests to cover the differences between HbbTV 2.0 and HbbTV 2.0.1, mostly required for the migration of Italy and the UK from their existing solutions to HbbTV.

Near Shore Development Centre (NSDC)
RT-RK is a strategic partner and Near Shore Development Centre (NSDC) of Cirrus Logic, Imagination Technologies, Wyplay, Zenterio, and Vestel in the consumer electronics industry. In May 2015, TTTech, a technology leader in robust networked safety controls and partner of Audi, announced a strategic partnership with RT-RK in the field of automotive electronics and industrial applications, by acquiring 35% of the company’s share capital.

Locations

References

External links
 

Consumer electronics
Software companies of Serbia
Serbian brands
Technology companies established in 1991
Electronic test equipment manufacturers
Serbian companies established in 1991